Beto Carrero (born João Batista Sergio Murad; 9 September 1937 – 1 February 2008) was a Brazilian theme park owner and entertainer. He was the creator of the Beto Carrero World Park, in the municipality of Penha, on the northern coast of the Brazilian state of Santa Catarina, which is the largest theme park in Latin America and the third largest in the world.

Biography
Carrero was born into a poor family in São José do Rio Preto, a town in upstate São Paulo, on Thursday, 9 September 1937. His father was a Lebanese immigrant who worked on a farm, and his mother was from Minas Gerais.

He worked as a Sertanejo musician, radio announcer and ad salesman before starting an advertising agency and, later, a theme park.

He owned what has been called the largest theme park in Latin America, Beto Carrero World in Penha, which he owned from its opening in 1991 until his death. He also appeared in several acting roles under his stage persona, a vaqueiro.

On Wednesday, 30 January 2008, he was admitted to Hospital Sírio-Libanês, in São Paulo, with a cardiac problem and died around two days later. The official cause of death was endocarditis. He is survived by three sons.

In June 2008, journalist Alex Solnik released a biography of Beto Carrero. It was titled Domador de Sonhos - A Vida Mágica de Beto Carrero (which means, in Portuguese, Tamer of Dreams - The Magical Life of Beto Carrero).

Comics 
In 1985, the As Aventuras de Beto Carrero comic book was published by Cluq Editorial, written by Gedeone Malagola and with art by Eugenio Colonnese. Although based on Bandeiras and Sertanejo periods, started in at the end of the 17th century. In the comics Beto did not use firearms, but instead his whip, to fight crime.

In November 2006, JB World Entertainment SA, Carrero's illustration and animation studio, launched the comic book The Adventures of Betinho Carrero. The title is about a young fan of Beto Carrero who dresses like him.

Death 
Beto Carrero died of endocarditis during surgery at 12:05 AM (02:05 GMT) on Friday, 1 February 2008.

Filmography 
 Os Trapalhões no Reino da Fantasia (1985)
 O Mistério de Robin Hood (1990)
 A História de Ana Raio e Zé Trovão (1990, TV series)

References

External links 

1937 births
2008 deaths
People from São José do Rio Preto
Brazilian people of Lebanese descent
20th-century Brazilian businesspeople
Deaths from endocarditis